The Best of Ray Stevens is a collection of previously recorded songs by Ray Stevens for Mercury Records, the very first label that Stevens signed with. It was released in 1968 by a subsidiary of Mercury called Wing Records. It is not to be confused with the 1967 compilation of the same name. Unlike most of the collections of Stevens' music, this compilation begins with the serious songs of Stevens. The back of the album cover contains an essay by Stuart Lewis that describes Stevens' ability to interpret dramatic songs as much as comedic songs. Lewis' essay begins with comparing this collection with a person, stating that it has two different sides. The A-side of the LP contains five of his serious songs, while the B-side contains five of his novelty songs.

Track listing

Album credits
Writer for all selections: Ray Stevens
Publisher for all selections: Lowery Music Co., Inc. (BMI)

1968 greatest hits albums
Mercury Records compilation albums
Ray Stevens compilation albums
Wing Records compilation albums